Alfonso, Prince of Asturias (10 May 1907 – 6 September 1938), was heir apparent to the throne of Spain from birth until the abolition of the monarchy in 1931. He renounced his rights to the defunct throne in 1933. Alfonso was the eldest son of King Alfonso XIII of Spain and his wife Victoria Eugenie of Battenberg.

Alfonso's renunciation of his rights as heir to the Spanish throne in order to marry Cuban commoner Edelmira Sampedro caused controversy at the time. A similar situation would take place three years later in Britain with his second cousin Edward VIII, who would abdicate as King of the United Kingdom to wed American divorcee Wallis Simpson.

He died at the age of 31 as a result of a car crash. Though appearing to have sustained minor injuries, his haemophilia, inherited through his great-grandmother Queen Victoria, led to fatal internal bleeding.

Early life
Alfonso was the eldest child of the then-reigning King Alfonso XIII and his wife, Victoria Eugenie of Battenberg. He inherited the genetic disorder haemophilia from his maternal line, as did a number of his matrilineal relatives. He and his youngest brother, Gonzalo, were kept in specially-tailored jackets to prevent injury from accidents.

He was born on 10 May 1907 at the Royal Palace of Madrid. As decreed by custom, he was registered by the Marquis of Figueroa, Minister of Justice, in the Civil Registry of the Royal Family as Alfonso Pío Cristino Eduardo Francisco Guillermo Carlos Enrique Eugenio Fernando Antonio Venancio.

Eight days after his birth, Alfonso was christened in the royal chapel of the Royal Palace of Madrid by the Archbishop of Toledo. His godparents were his grandmother Queen Maria Cristina and Pope Pius X, who was represented by Cardinal Rinaldini. The Duke of Connaught, Prince Friedrich Leopold of Prussia, Archduke Eugen of Austria and Afonso, Duke of Porto, were also present. After the ceremony, his father conferred upon him the collars of the orders of the Golden Fleece and Charles III and the Grand Cross of the Order of Isabella the Catholic.

Alfonso's father faced increasing political problems that led Spain to become a republic in 1931 when the monarch was deposed. The family moved into exile.

Renunciation and marriages
There had been plans for young Alfonso's deposition from succession, but ultimately he himself renounced his rights to the then-defunct throne to marry a commoner, Edelmira Sampedro y Robato, religiously in Ouchy on 21 June 1933, after which Alfonso took the courtesy title Count of Covadonga. This was required by the regulations for the succession set by the Pragmatic Sanction of Charles III. The couple divorced 8 May 1937, with Edelmira keeping the title Countess of Covadonga.

In a civil ceremony on 3 July 1937, Alfonso married another commoner, Marta Esther Rocafort-Altuzarra in Havana. They divorced on 8 January 1938. He had no children by either of his wives. However, Alfonso de Bourbon, a resident of California, later claimed to be an illegitimate son of Alfonso.

In 1938, Alfonso, then resident in the United States, publicly stated his readiness to accept the Spanish crown if called on to do so. Spain was at this date in the midst of civil war. This action reversed Alfonso's renunciation of 1933 and led to his being disavowed by his father King Alfonso.

Death
A car crash led to Alfonso's early death in 1938, at the age of 31. He was being driven at night through Miami by an entertainer, Miss Mildred Gaydon, who swerved to avoid a truck. The car crashed into a telephone booth and Alfonso appeared to have only minor injuries but his haemophilia led to fatal internal bleeding. He was entombed at Woodlawn Park Cemetery and Mausoleum (now Caballero Rivero Woodlawn Park North Cemetery and Mausoleum) in Miami, and was re-entombed in 1985 at the Pantheon of the Princes in El Escorial. His first wife, who had been allowed to retain the title Countess of Covadonga, was asked by the royal family to attend the re-entombment, but she declined.

Alfonso was the 1,120th Knight of the Order of the Golden Fleece in Spain and Knight with Collar of the Order of Charles III, inducted as both shortly after his birth in 1907.

Gallery

Ancestry

Bibliography 
 Pedersen, Jørgen. Riddere af Elefantordenen 1559–2009, Odense: Syddansk Universitetsforlag, 2009.

Sources
 Time, 12 June 1933
 El Nuevo Herald, 23 May 2004
 El Mundo, 2 July 1994

References

External links

|-

|-

House of Bourbon (Spain)
Spanish infantes
1907 births
1938 deaths
Sons of kings
Haemophilia in European royalty
Princes of Asturias
Heirs apparent who never acceded
Road incident deaths in Florida
Burials in the Pantheon of Infantes at El Escorial
Knights of the Golden Fleece of Spain
Knights of Santiago
Knights Grand Cross of the Order of Isabella the Catholic
Spanish expatriates in Cuba
Royal reburials